The 2018 Asian Shotgun Championships were held in Sheikh Sabah Al-Ahmad Olympic Shooting Complex Kuwait City, Kuwait between November 2 and 12, 2018.

Medal summary

Men

Women

Mixed

Medal table

References

External links 

 ISSF Results Overview
 Asian Shooting Federation

Asian
Asian Shooting Championships
Shooting
Kuwait City